Romaniv (formerly Dzerzhynsk) is an urban-type settlement in Zhytomyr Raion, Zhytomyr Oblast, Ukraine. Prior to the 2020 administrative reform, it was the administrative center of the former Romaniv Raion. Population:

History 
Within the Russian Empire, Romaniv was part of the Novograd-Volynsky Uyezd of the Volhynian Governorate.

History of the Jews of Romaniv

References

Urban-type settlements in Zhytomyr Raion
Novograd-Volynsky Uyezd
Zhytomyr Raion